Lewis Creek is a stream in the U.S. state of Montana. It is a tributary to the Flathead River.

Lewis Creek was named after D. H. Lewis, a local ranger.

References

Rivers of Montana
Rivers of Flathead County, Montana